John Stuart Hindmarsh (25 November 1907 – 6 September 1938) was an English racecar driver and aviator.

Career
Hindmarsh was educated at Sherborne, Dorset and then attended the Royal Military College. He joined the Royal Army Tank Corps in 1928, then in 1930 learned to fly with the Royal Air Force.

Hindmarsh also raced Talbot and Lagonda cars; he won the Le Mans 24-Hour Race in 1935 in a 4½ litre Lagonda M45R Rapide with Luis Fontés (222 laps; 3006.797 km; average speed 125.283 km/h).

Hindmarsh was killed aged 30 while test flying Hawker Hurricane I L1652 at Brooklands on 6 September 1938; he is thought to have been overcome by carbon monoxide fumes in the cockpit, and the aeroplane then dived almost vertically into the ground and exploded at the foot of St George's Hill almost opposite the Vickers factory entrance.

Family life
Hindmarsh married the multiple record breaking racing driver Violette Cordery on 15 September 1931 at Stoke D'Abernon parish church, and they had two daughters, one of whom married the racing driver Roy Salvadori. Widowed in 1938, Cordery retired from public life until her death on 30 December 1983 in Oxshott, Surrey.

Racing record

Complete 24 Hours of Le Mans results

References

John Hindmarsh at Historic Racing

1907 births
1938 deaths
24 Hours of Le Mans drivers
24 Hours of Le Mans winning drivers
Aviators killed in aviation accidents or incidents in England
English racing drivers
English aviators
Graduates of the Royal Military College, Sandhurst
Royal Tank Regiment officers
Royal Air Force officers
Victims of aviation accidents or incidents in 1938
20th-century British Army personnel
20th-century Royal Air Force personnel